Maria Madlen Madsen (23 March 1905 – 23 March 1990), temporarily also under the stage name Gerda Hansi, was a German operatic soprano, theatre, film and television actress.

Life

Training period 
Born in Krefeld, Madsen grew up in Hamburg, went to school there and studied classical singing with Robert Dähmke for four years. Under the stage name Gerda Hansi she first worked between 1926 and 1929 as a program employee (singer) for the Süddeutscher Rundfunk and became known there as the "Schwäbische Nachtigall" (Swabian Nightingale). She also took part in a new form of broadcasting which was popular among the listeners at the time, the Stadt-Portraits presented as a radio play. Parallel to this she was taught in Stuttgart by the pedagogue Daimler.

Career 

From 1929 to 1934 she was engaged by the Opernhaus Zürich in Switzerland, where she took part in the premiere of Zemlinsky's Der Kreidekreis in 1933.

From 1934 she was engaged by the Oper Frankfurt. For Madsen began a twelve-year lasting great career in the Third Reich as coloratura-soubrette. She participated in the premiere of Werner Egk's Die Zaubergeige  on 22 May 1935 as Gretl and in the premiere of Carl Orff's Carmina Burana on 8 June 1937 as a soloist.

Guest performances led Madsen to the Berlin State Opera, Wroclaw, Semperoper Dresden, Hamburg State Opera, Bavarian State Opera Munich and Staatstheater Stuttgart, abroad in the Gran Teatre del Liceu Barcelona, Belgrade, Bologna and Paris Opera.

After the Second World War Madsen was engaged by Radio Frankfurt (later Hessischer Rundfunk) for archive and studio productions. During this time she met colleagues such as Trude Eipperle, Franz Fehringer, Ferdinand Frantz, Karl Friedrich, Herbert Hess, Otto von Rohr, Helge Rosvaenge, Heinrich Schlusnus, Erik Schumann, Georg Stern and Günther Treptow.

She was preferably cast for comic stage roles such as Despina in Mozart's Così fan tutte, Zerline in Don Giovanni, Blondchen in Die Entführung aus dem Serail, Marzelline in Beethoven's Fidelio, Ännchen in Weber's Der Freischütz, Marie in Lortzing's Zar und Zimmermann, Frau Fluth in Adam's Der Postillon von Lonjumeau, Musetta in Puccini's La Bohème, Adele in Strauss II's Die Fledermaus and as Christel in Zeller's Der Vogelhändler.

In addition, she became known and highly esteemed as a concert and lieder singer, at least in the early 1950s she also sang popular songs on Hessischer Rundfunk radio.

Plays 
From the second half of the 1950s she was cast as an actress for mainly comic roles, e.g. in the Frankfurt Kleinen Theater im Zoo, but also in German Television. After the end of her singing career she gave lessons in voice training to young singers in Frankfurt am Main from 1963.

Radio 
After her activity as a singing program assistant for the Süddeutscher Rundfunk  between 1926 and 1929, Madsen was active as a radio announcer in the 1960s and took on roles in radio dramas.

Madsen died in Frankfurt am Main on her 85th birthday.

Filmography 
 1956: Herr Hesselbach und die Firma
 1956: Der Verräter
 1958: Der Dank der Unterwelt
 1959: Kopfgeld
 1959: Ein unbeschriebenes Blatt
 1960: Die Friedhöfe
 1967: Die Namenstagfeier (1967)

References

Further reading 
  (ed.): . Personengeschichtliches Lexikon. Second volume. M–Z (Veröffentlichungen der Frankfurter Historischen Kommission. Volume XIX, Nr. 2). Waldemar Kramer, Frankfurt am Main 1996, .
 Antje Vowinckel: "Collagen im Hörspiel – Die Entwicklung einer radiophonen Kunst". Dissertation, Universität Bielefeld 1994. Königshausen & Neumann. Würzburg 1995.

External links 
 Madsen Maria Madlen on Operissimo
 
 

German operatic sopranos
German film actresses
German stage actresses
German radio presenters
German women radio presenters
1905 births
1990 deaths
People from Krefeld
20th-century German women opera singers